This is a timeline of the history of the former British broadcaster Southern Television. It provided the ITV service for the South and South East of England from 1958 to 1981.

1950s
 1958
30 August – At 5:30 pm, Southern Television begins broadcasting.
 1959
No events.

1960s 
 1960
 31 January – Southern Television's broadcast area expands when it begins broadcasting to Kent and East Sussex following the Independent Television Authority granting Southern the right to broadcast to South East England.
 Southern makes minor changes to the visual look of its on-screen logo. The stylised star is banished and replaced by a more compass-like star symbol.
1961
 Southern opens studios in Dover and launches localised news opt-outs for the east of the region, becoming the first broadcaster in the UK provide such a service.
 4 April – Southern launches a weeknight 30-minute regional news programme called Day By Day.
1962
 No events.
1963
 No events.
 1964
 9 October – Southern launches a weekly news magazine for South East England called Friday on Ten.  This is shown instead of the Friday edition of regional news magazine Day by Day.
 Southern is given a three-year extension to its licence. This is later extended by a further year.
1965
 No events.
1966
 Southern Television Limited renames itself Southern Independent Television Limited as part of the 1968 ITV franchise round.
 1967
 Southern begins construction of its new studio complex, to be called Television Centre, Southampton.
 The Independent Television Authority renews Southern's licence for a further seven years.
 1968
 August – A technicians strike forces ITV off the air for several weeks although management manage to launch a temporary ITV Emergency National Service with no regional variations.
 1969
 19 August – Southern moves into its new purpose-built studios.
 13 December — Southern starts broadcasting in colour but does not mark the change with any alteration to its logo other than replacing the black background with a blue background.

1970s 
 1970
 No events.
 1971
 No events.
 1972
 16 October – Following a law change which removed all restrictions on broadcasting hours, ITV is able to launch an afternoon service.
 1973
 No events.
 1974
 The 1974 franchise round sees no changes in ITV's contractors as it is felt that the huge cost in switching to colour television would have made the companies unable to compete against rivals in a franchise battle.
 1975
 No events.
 1976
 No events.
 1977
 Due to the popularity of weekly magazine programme Scene South East, Southern launches Scene Midweek. This replaces part two of the Wednesday edition of Day by Day.
 26 November – At around 5:10 pm, the Southern Television broadcast interruption takes place. The disruption, which occurs at the Hannington transmitter, is to sound only and lasts for six minutes.
 1978
 No events.
 1979
 10 August – The ten week ITV strike forces Southern Television off the air. The strike ends on 24 October.

1980s 
 1980
 28 December – The Independent Broadcasting Authority announces that Southern has lost its franchise to TVS.
 1981
 August – Southern sells its Southampton studios to TVS but Southern continues to use them until its franchise runs out at the end of the year.
 1982
 1 January – Southern Television closes down for the final time at 12:43 am.
 After 1982
 1983 – TVS closes Southern's Dover studios following the opening of its new studios at Maidstone.
 1984 – Southern's Dover studios are demolished.
 Southern's programme archive is sold to Southern Star Group, who later sell it on to Renown Pictures.

See also 
 History of ITV
 History of ITV television idents
 Timeline of ITV
 Timeline of TVS – Southern's successor

References

Television in the United Kingdom by year
ITV timelines